Louise Suski (June 27, 1905 – June 5, 2003) was the first woman editor-in-chief and English-section editor-in-chief at the Japanese-English language newspaper Rafu Shimpo.

Early life 
On June 27, 1905, Suski was born in San Francisco. She had six siblings, including Julia Suski who illustrated for Rafu Shimpo from 1926 to 1929. Her family attended the Maryknoll Catholic Church. In 1924, Suski graduated from Los Angeles High School. After graduating, she applied to the University of California, Los Angeles to purse a career in education, but she never finished her degree.

Career 
In 1926, Suski became the first woman editor-in-chief and English language editor-in-chief at Rafu Shimpo. She worked at Rafu Shimpo until 1942 and was colleagues with Togo Tanaka. Due to the incarceration of Japanese Americans during World War II in the United States, Suski and her family were incarcerated at Heart Mountain Relocation Center. While at Heart Mountain Relocation Center, Suski joined the center's newspaper, Heart Mountain Sentinel.

After the war, Suski moved to Chicago. She would go on to work for General Mailing and Sales Company, the Japanese American Evacuation and Resettlement Study (JERS) office, Scene magazine, and Shikago Shimpo.

Death 
Suski retired in 1978 and returned to Cerritos to live with her brother and sister-in-law. She died in 2003.

References 

1905 births
American people of Japanese descent
People from San Francisco
Los Angeles High School alumni
Japanese-American internees
American women journalists of Asian descent
Women newspaper editors
2003 deaths